Lopholaena festiva, or the shiny fluff-bush, is a species of plant from South Africa.

Description

Branches 
It is covered in rough greyish bark. The secondary branches (which have a diameter of up to ) are brown with longitudinal fissures and leaf scars. The tertiary branches are brown with deep longitudinal wrinkles and have jutting out leaf scars. The young branches are black with sooty moulds.

Leaves 
The hairless leaves are alternately arranged on grow directly on the branches. The veins, while mostly invisible, curve towards the margins. Sometimes two lateral veins will be visible.

Flowers 
White flowers are borne in terminal corymbs. They emit a honey-like scent. It starts off cylindrical, but becomes disc shaped, flaring above. They are surrounded by linear bracts that are woolly in the axils. The tops of the anthers are commonly purple and are clearly visible in open flowers.

Fruits 
This plant produces achenes - small, dry fruits that contain a single seed. They are brown with a slight white sheen as a consequence of the sparse hairs.

Similar species 
This plant is most similar to Lopholaena cneorifolia. L. festiva, however, has much wider hairs and fewer hairs on the achenes (which are a silvery white in L. cneorifolia as a result of the hairs). L. festiva also has fewer spinules per intercolpar area (23-28) than L. cneorifolia (36-38) in the pollen.

Distribution and habitat 
This plant is endemic to the Limpopo province of South Africa. It is known from the Blouberg, the Soutpansberg, the Strydpoortberg, and the northern parts of the Drakensberg. It is often found growing from cracks in quartzite or sandstone rock faces, fully exposed to the sun in the absence of surrounding vegetation, although it may sometimes be found on wooded slopes.

Conservation 
This species is considered to be of least concern by the South African National Biodiversity Institute.

References 

Plants described in 1991
Flora of South Africa
Senecioneae